Barn av solen is a 1955 Norwegian comedy film directed by Arne Skouen, starring Henny Moan, Rut Fredriksen and Arne Jacobsen.

External links
 
 Barn av solen at Filmweb.no (Norwegian)

1955 films
1955 comedy films
Films directed by Arne Skouen
Norwegian comedy films
Norwegian black-and-white films